Huffs Corners, Ontario may refer to:

Huffs Corners, Prince Edward County, Ontario
Huffs Corners, Lambton County, Ontario